John Tobin was a ship launched in 1809 at Hull. In 1810 she recaptured a British vessel and in November 1812 she repelled an attack by an American privateer in a single ship action. From 1816 John Tobin made three voyages to India, sailing under a license from the British East India Company (EIC). She then sailed to Calabar, West Africa. She left there on 28 November 1821 and was never heard of again.

Career
John Tobin first appeared in Lloyd's Register (LR) in the volume for 1810.

Captain Lawrence Hall acquired a letter of marque on 30 December 1809.

John Tobin recaptured Hart, which returned to Liverpool on 8 February. Prize money for Harts recapture was paid to John Tobins master and crew in October 1811.

In mid-1810 John Tobin carried sugar, rum, and slaves from St Croix to the West Indies.

Captain George Howard acquired a letter of marque on 7 February 1812.

On 25 November 1812 John Tobin, Howard, master, arrived at Bahia from London. The privateer was Alfred, of twenty 9-pounder guns (including two stern chasers). There were no British casualties.

John Tobin arrived safely back in Liverpool on 19 April 1813, having sailed from Bahia on 17 February 1813. She was carrying cotton, cow hides, etc. The Underwriters of Liverpool presented Captain Howard with a silver cup in appreciation of his "gallant and seamanlike conduct in defending his ship". 

In May 1815 John Tobin arrived back at Liverpool from Barbados with sugar, cotton, ginger, arrowroot, old copper, tamarinds, and cocoa nuts.  

She had suffered some damage to her sails and other trifling damage. She was reported to have arrived in New York with Howland, master. She returned from New York with turpentine, tar, staves, and cotton. 

In 1813 the EIC had lost its monopoly on the trade between India and Britain. British ships such as John Tobin were now free to sail to India or the Indian Ocean under a license from the EIC.

She arrived at Calcutta on 2 January 1817. While there she received repairs and new copper sheathing.< She left Bengal on 13 August. On 14 November she was at the Cape of Good Hope on her way back to Liverpool; she left on 19 November. She arrived back at Liverpool on 10 January 1818.

In 1818 John Tobin, A. Keenan, master, sailed from Liverpool for Bombay. On 28 April 1819 John Tobin had returned and was off Liverpool; she had sailed from Bengal on 5 December 1818.

On 13 August 1820 John Tobin was at Saint Helena on her way back from Bengal. She had sailed from the Sand Heads on 16 May. she arrived in Liverpool on 18 October. Her cargo consisted of wine, sugar, indigo, rice, sago, and saltpetre, etc.

Fate
On 28 November 1821 John Tobin sailed from Calabar for Liverpool. She was never heard from again.

Notes, citations, and references
Notes

Citations

References
 
 
 
 

1809 ships
Age of Sail merchant ships of England
Maritime incidents in November 1821